Arariboia (old spelling: Ararigboya) is the founder of the city of Niterói, in Brazil.

He was the leader of the Temiminó tribe, which inhabited the territory of the present Espírito Santo state and came to Rio de Janeiro in 1564, with Estácio de Sá's fleet. Under his leadership, the tribe assisted the Portuguese in their war with France for total control of the Guanabara Bay. After their victory, Arariboia remained in Rio de Janeiro until 1573, when his tribe officially received the lands across the Guanabara Bay on November 22.

Arariboia also received the title of knight of the Order of Christ, Captain of the village (Capitão-Mor), a salary of 12,000 réis per year and a piece of clothing that had belonged to King Sebastian of Portugal.

In 1568 he received the Christian name of Martim Afonso, to honour Martim Afonso de Sousa. He died in 1589.

In Tupi, his name refers to a venomous snake from the Boidae family.

References

External links 

 From Arariboia to Martim Afonso: the Native change in the waters of the Guanabara Bay

Colonial Brazil
1589 deaths
Converts to Roman Catholicism from pagan religions
Indigenous leaders of the Americas
Year of birth unknown
16th-century indigenous people of the Americas
Tupí people
France Antarctique